The Hoch Ducan (also known as Piz Ducan) is a mountain in the Albula Range, located in Graubünden, Switzerland.

Notes

External links
 Hoch Ducan on Hikr

Mountains of the Alps
Alpine three-thousanders
Mountains of Switzerland
Mountains of Graubünden
Davos
Bergün Filisur